Leninsky Prospekt is a station on the Kirovsko-Vyborgskaya Line of the Saint Petersburg Metro, located between Avtovo and Prospekt Veteranov.

The station was opened on 29 September 1977 in the section between Avtovo and Prospekt Veteranov, replacing the temporary surface station Dachnoye. It is named after the street of the same name, where one of the entrances is located.

Station facilities 

There is no above-ground pavilion; entrance to the station is provided through underground pedestrian crossings, with exits onto Leninsky Prospekt and Bulvar Novatorov.  Because of the station's shallow depth, neither exit has escalators.

The underground hall was constructed as a project of the architects A. S. Getskin and Ye. I. Val and the engineer A. N. Yakovlev. The design of the station echoes Lenin's Mausoleum. The platforms and the columns, which widen at the top, are faced with red Karelian granite. Unpolished white marble is used to decorate the walls.

In the summer of 2012, the exit onto Leninsky Prospekt was equipped with the first Metro lift in St. Petersburg for people with disabilities.

History 
The station was constructed using the same cut and cover method as the neighboring stations Avtovo and Prospekt Veteranov.

Until the early 1990s the station was notable in its quadruple commemoration of the name of Lenin in its friezes: "V. I. Lenin Metro of Leningrad, order of Lenin.  Leninsky Prospekt Station."  Another station with same situation was Ploshchad Lenina.

Transit connections 

 Trolleybus - Routes  29, 32, 35, 44, 45
 Municipal bus - Routes  18, 18А, 26, 73, 87, 114, 130, 142
 Marshrutka - К-29, К-35, К-43, К-45, К-49, К-87, К-114, К-130, К-142, К-216, К-217, К-224 (103), К-226, К-227, К-242, К-246, К-333, К-338, К-339, К-344, К-420, К-639, К-639В

See also 
 Leninsky Prospekt (Moscow metro)

References

External links 
  Description of the station on Metrowalks.ru
  Description of the station on Kommet.spb.ru

Saint Petersburg Metro stations
Railway stations in Russia opened in 1977
Railway stations located underground in Russia